Jane Alison Shaw (born 1963) is Principal of Harris Manchester College, Oxford, Professor of the History of Religion, and Pro-Vice-Chancellor at the University of Oxford. Previously she was Professor of Religious Studies and Dean of Religious Life at Stanford University and Dean of Grace Cathedral in San Francisco.

Life and career 
Jane Shaw grew up in Norwich, England, on the grounds of the Great Hospital, a medieval hospital with its own chapel and cloisters where her father was master. She attended Norwich High School for Girls, a private school. She studied modern history at University of Oxford, graduating with a Bachelor of Arts (BA) degree in 1985.  She went on to study theology at Harvard University, graduating with a Master of Divinity (M.Div.) degree in 1988. She completed a Ph.D. in history at the University of California, Berkeley (1994). She has received honorary doctorates from the Episcopal Divinity School and Colgate University.

Shaw taught history and theology at Oxford University for sixteen years. She was a fellow of Regent's Park College from 1994 to 2001 (Dean 1998–2001), and then Official Fellow and Dean of Divinity of New College, Oxford (2001–2010). Having trained in the St Albans and Oxford Ministry Course, she was ordained deacon in 1997 and priest in 1998. Shaw was Dean of Grace Cathedral, San Francisco, from 2010 to 2014.

Shaw has held appointments as an honorary chaplain and honorary canon of Christ Church, Oxford, Director of the Oxford University Summer Programme in Theology, and Canon Theologian of Salisbury Cathedral. She served as a governor of a British boys' public school, Winchester College.

Writing
Shaw's interests include the Enlightenment, modern religious history, ethics, and issues in gender, sexuality, and the role of technology in society. She has published several books, including Miracles in Enlightenment England (Yale University Press, 2006), Octavia, Daughter of God (Jonathan Cape, 2011), A Practical Christianity (SPCK, 2012), and Pioneers of Modern Spirituality (DLT, 2017). She edited Culture and the Nonconformist Tradition (with Alan Kreider; Chicago: University of Chicago Press, 1999), The Call for Women Bishops (with Harriet Harris; afterword by Marilyn McCord Adams; London: SPCK, 2004) and History of a Modern Millennial Movement (with Philip Lockley, Bloomsbury, 2017).

Shaw's academic writing focuses on lived religion, which Robert Orsi describes as "the volatile and unpredictable nature of religious creation". "Miracles in Enlightenment England" showed how the experience of miracles in Enlightenment England challenged the elites. Her book "Octavia Daughter of God" won the 2012 San Francisco Book Festival History Prize, sponsored by JM Northern Media LLC. It unearthed the story of a female Messiah figure living in Bedford, England in the early twentieth century. The book was praised for showing how, and under what circumstances, a religion grows.

Shaw's work often appeals to doubt and the questioning of faith, saying, "If we think faith is about certainty then we can become arrogant and think we know God wholly and that is very limiting." Themes of loss, doubt, and forgiveness are explored in A Practical Christianity. She also focusses on art and spirituality, and what she calls "the moral imagination", which she describes as "a deep responsiveness to that which is different from us". In The Mystical Turn, a series of five programmes on BBC Radio 3, Shaw explored the relationship between spirituality and mysticism in the works of Russian artist Kandinsky and his contemporaries.

Activism
Shaw has combined the work of a church historian with active participation in the life of the Anglican churches and campaigning for the ordination of women to the priesthood and the episcopate. She served as vice-chair of WATCH Women and the Church. She regularly writes for The Times and the Guardian on issues pertaining to politics, religion, and the arts. Shaw was an original member of a thinktank, the Chicago Consultation, advocating for LGBT Christians, and she has worked with V-Day on behalf of women who are victims of violence. In 2013, she joined the Board of the NGO Human Rights Watch in California.

References

Selected publications

External links
Profile at Harris Manchester College website

People from Oxford
Principals of Harris Manchester College, Oxford
Pro-Vice-Chancellors of the University of Oxford
Fellows of Regent's Park College, Oxford
Alumni of Regent's Park College, Oxford
Harvard Divinity School alumni
University of California, Berkeley alumni
Fellows of New College, Oxford
English historians
21st-century English Anglican priests
Chaplains of New College, Oxford
Honorary chaplains of Christ Church, Oxford
English theologians
Anglican writers
The Guardian journalists
English journalists
1963 births
Living people
People educated at Norwich High School for Girls